St. Anthony High School was a coeducational Catholic high school in Detroit, Michigan, United States and belonged to the Catholic Archdiocese of Detroit. The first high school was built in 1918 on the corner of Field and Frederick Street in Detroit. A new high school was then built in 1926 across the street, featuring 13 classrooms, laboratories, and a large study hall. St. Anthony was a member of the Michigan High School Athletic Association and competed athletically in the Catholic High School League.

Following a series of consolidations of Catholic schools, several were merged into St. Anthony to form East Catholic High School in 1969.

Notable alumni
 Jack Piana (1918–2001), professional basketball player for the Detroit Eagles in the National Basketball League during the 1940–41 season

References

Defunct Catholic secondary schools in Michigan
Educational institutions established in 1918
Educational institutions disestablished in 1969
High schools in Detroit
Roman Catholic Archdiocese of Detroit
1918 establishments in Michigan